J. C. Batzner is a composer primarily of electronic music and is a currently on the faculty of Central Michigan University. Jay Batzner is also the programming director for Electronic Music Midwest He ran a daily podcast about miniatures He wrote the music for Carla Poindexter's Carnival Daring Do His 10-minute opera Secrets & Waffles debuted in Carnegie Hall with the Remarkable Theater Brigade's Opera Shorts in 2010. Batzner's work was also part of several 60x60 mixes including the Sanguine Mix, Order of Magnitude Mix, 2009 International Mix, Evolution Mix (part I), 2005 Midwest Mix. 
In 2012, Jay Batzner brought 60x60 Dance with his colleague Heather Trommer-Beardslee to Central Michigan University

Discography
Quills and Jacks of Outrageous Fortune 60x60 2005 CD Vox Novus
Sonance: New Music for Piano

References

External links
 Jay Batzner's Homepage
 Biography at Vox Novus

20th-century classical composers
21st-century classical composers
American electronic musicians
American male classical composers
American classical composers
Living people
21st-century American composers
20th-century American composers
20th-century American male musicians
21st-century American male musicians
Year of birth missing (living people)